Fiji competed at the 2008 Summer Paralympics in Beijing, China. The country's delegation consisted of a single athlete, visually impaired sprinter Ranjesh Prakash, who competed in two events in athletics. Prakash was also his country's flagbearer during the Games' opening ceremony.

High jumper Iliesa Delana was initially reported in May 2007 as having qualified for the Games, but it was later reported that he had "fallen short during trials".

Athletics

See also
Fiji at the 2008 Summer Olympics

References

Nations at the 2008 Summer Paralympics
2008
Paralympics